Signy Research Station (originally Station H) is an Antarctic research base on Signy Island, run by the British Antarctic Survey.

History
Signy was first occupied in 1947 when a three-man meteorological station was established in Factory Cove above the old whaling station. It was the second research base on the South Orkney Islands (after the Argentine Orcadas Base in 1903). In 1955, a new hut, Tønsberg House was built on the site of the whaling station. In 1963, it was turned into a laboratory for biological research. Initially operated year-round, since 1995/6 the station has been open from November to April each year (southern hemisphere summer).

Facilities
Today, the base has four buildings with capacity for 8 people. The main building, Sørlle House (named after the whaling captain Petter Sørlle, who himself named Signy Island), provides living accommodation and laboratories. The other buildings are for storage and provision of power and water services. There are also four small huts around the island.

A light railway was constructed in 1963 for unloading stores and large items of machinery.  When built, this was the southernmost railway in existence.  It was later extended up a hill to reach the fuel tanks.

Research
Marine and terrestrial biology is carried out at Signy, particularly looking at the effects of climate change on the southern ocean ecosystems. Three species of penguin (Adélie, chinstrap and gentoo) are monitored at the base.

To continue an original time series of visual sea ice observations after the station became summer-only, an automated sea ice camera now operates all year around, providing a continuous record of sea ice extent near the station for over 50 years.

Climate
Signy Research Station has a tundra climate (ET according to the Köppen climate classification), because all twelve months have a mean temperature under . Signy Research Station has very long, cold winters (although they are mild for Antarctic standards) and short, cool summers. It has only three months with the average temperature above freezing point.

See also
 List of Antarctic research stations
 List of Antarctic field camps
 Crime in Antarctica

References

External links
 Official website British Antarctic Survey
 BAS Signy Research Station
 BAS Signy Research Station Images at BAS
 COMNAP Antarctic Facilities
 COMNAP Antarctic Facilities Map

Outposts of Antarctica
British Antarctic Territory
British Antarctic Survey
1947 establishments in Antarctica